Eremo di Sant'Egidio (Italian for Hermitage of Sant'Egidio) is an hermitage located in Scanno, Province of L'Aquila (Abruzzo, Italy).

History

Architecture

References

External links

Egidio
Scanno, Abruzzo